Coverkill is a cover album released by thrash metal band Overkill in 1999. The album consists of cover songs by artists that influenced the band, including Deep Purple, Black Sabbath, Motörhead, Kiss, Judas Priest, Jethro Tull, Ramones, Sex Pistols, the Dead Boys, and Manowar. This was Overkill's first release with guitarist Dave Linsk.

Track listing

Personnel
Bobby Ellsworth – lead vocals
D. D. Verni – bass, backing vocals
Dave Linsk – lead guitar
Joe Comeau – rhythm guitar
Tim Mallare – drums
Sid Falck - drums

Additional personnel
Andy Katz – producer, engineer
Alex Perialas – mixing
Colin Richardson – mixing

References

External links
 Official OVERKILL Site

Overkill (band) albums
Covers albums
1999 albums
SPV/Steamhammer albums